

The Grumman G-118 (sometimes called the XF12F, though this was never official) was a design for an all-weather missile-armed interceptor aircraft for use on US Navy aircraft carriers. Originally conceived as an uprated F11F Tiger, it soon evolved into a larger and more powerful project. Although two prototypes were ordered in 1955, development was cancelled the same year in favor of the F4H Phantom II before any examples were built. Grumman's next (and last) carrier fighter would be the F-14 Tomcat, ordered in 1968.

Design
The Grumman Design 118 was a two-seat, twin-engined, rocket augmented, carrier-based all-weather supersonic fighter aircraft. It had a 45° swept wing, a "T-tail" empennage, two small folding ventral fins, and a landing gear of tricycle configuration. For ejection, the tandem crew were encapsulated and ejected downwards. It also featured a boundary layer control system to improve low speed handling.

The G-118 was to be powered by two J79-GE-3 engines, with accommodations for the more powerful J79-GE-207 engines each producing 18,000 lbf of afterburning thrust. Similar to the contemporary Vought XF8U-3 Crusader III, it was designed with an additional throttleable liquid-fueled rocket engine using a mixture of JP-4 fuel and hydrogen peroxide oxidizer which produced 5,000 lbf of thrust.

Armament stores would have been under the fuselage in two semi-recessed hardpoints for the AIM-7 Sparrow air-to-air missile and an internal weapons bay for an additional AIM-7 or three AIM-9 Sidewinder missiles.

Specifications (G-118, as designed)

See also

References

Notes

Bibliography
 
 
 
 
 
 

G-118
Cancelled military aircraft projects of the United States
Twinjets
Mid-wing aircraft
Carrier-based aircraft